Maurycy Kacper Popiel (born 3 January 1990) is a Polish actor.

Biography
Maurycy is the son of Polish actress Lidia Bogaczówna. In 2012, he completed studies at the Ludwik Solski Academy for the Dramatic Arts in Kraków. He is employed at the Bagatela Theatre since 2012.
Actor is best known for his role in the melodrama-war film Warsaw 44 and soap opera M jak miłość. In both productions, he played one of the leading roles.

Selected filmography
 2005: 
 2010: Mała matura as Marek
 2011: Czas honoru (TV series) as Dieter Kugel
 2013: 2XL (TV series) as bartender
 2014: Warsaw 44 as Góral
 2014–present: M jak miłość (TV series) as Aleksander Chodakowski, Marcin's brother
 2016-2017: Pierwsza miłość (TV series) as Damian

References

External links 

1990 births
Living people
Polish male film actors